Eva Maria "Katarina" Hultling (born 5 December 1954 in Stockholm; in marriage known as Hultling Sjöberg) is a Swedish sports journalist, television presenter and former curler.

Biography
Hultling is the daughter of actor Arthur Hultling and grew up in Stockholm and Västerås. After attending Adolf Fredrik's music school and Adolf Fredrik's music high school, she began as an exchange telephonist at Hotel Reisen in Stockholm. She wanted to become an actress and applied for the Stage School, but did not enter. Instead, she was accepted to the School of Journalism and then began as a reporter on Radio Värmland.

Hultling has a great sporting interest and has played curling at the elite level for many years. In 1982 and 1983 she was a member of Team Högström. In 1992 she ran the New York Marathon.

In 1999, she released a record with her own children's songs, Victor's Visor.

Journalism career
Later Hultling started her work on national radio and read news telegrams. During the second half of 1987, she became the program manager for TV's news magazine "20:00". From 1989 to 1992 she did the annual program "The Year with the Royal Family" and has also reported from the Nobel Dinner. In 1993 she returned to the sports editorial department and has done programs such as Sportnytt, Sportspegeln and Lilla Sportspegeln.

On 23 December 2007 she made her final broadcast in the Sports Mirror, following over 1,600 programs. She has since switched to TV4 as a commentator for curling and figure skating.

Private life
In June 1987, Hultling married radio reporter Claes Sjöberg. They adopted a son in 1990. In the mid-1990s, she met her current partner Albert Svanberg.

Hultling has publicly stated that she has breast cancer. In SVT's talk program Skavlan, in March 2012 she told about the disease and exposed her bare head.

Curling career
She is a two-time , a two-time , Swedish women's and mixed champion.

In 1982, she was inducted into the Swedish Curling Hall of Fame.

Teams

Women's

Mixed

References

External links

 

Katarina Hultling | Blå Kokboken
Katarina Hultling | Speakers&friends

Living people
1954 births
Journalists from Stockholm
Swedish television hosts
Swedish women television presenters
Swedish women journalists
20th-century Swedish journalists
21st-century Swedish journalists
Swedish sports broadcasters
Swedish female curlers
European curling champions
Swedish curling champions